Eupinivora albolineana is a species of moth of the family Tortricidae. It is found in mountains of Durango in Mexico.

The length of the forewings is 10–10.5 mm. The basal part of the forewings is pale rust orange, but slightly paler orange along the dorsum. The lower portion of the discal cell has a white longitudinal blotch. The hindwings are pale grey.

Larvae have been reared on Pinus arizonica var. cooperi.

Etymology
The species name refers to the white linear patch of the forewing.

References

Moths described in 2013
Cochylini